is a Japanese former competitive figure skater. She is a four-time Japanese national champion and competed twice at the Winter Olympics, placing 14th in 1968 and 10th in 1972. She is an alumna of Kwansei Gakuin University.

Competitive highlights

References

1948 births
Living people
Japanese female single skaters
Olympic figure skaters of Japan
Figure skaters at the 1968 Winter Olympics
Figure skaters at the 1972 Winter Olympics
Universiade medalists in figure skating
Sportspeople from Osaka Prefecture
Universiade bronze medalists for Japan
Competitors at the 1968 Winter Universiade